Fritz Schade (January 19, 1880 – June 17, 1926) was a German-born American film actor of the silent era. He appeared in 41 films between 1913 and 1918, including six films with Charlie Chaplin. His wife was the silent film actress Betty Schade.

Selected filmography
 Dough and Dynamite (1914)
 The Masquerader (1914)
 His Prehistoric Past (1914)
 The Face on the Bar Room Floor (1914)
 Laughing Gas (1914)
 His Musical Career (1914)
 Tillie's Punctured Romance (1914) as Waiter/Diner (uncredited)
 Dangers of a Bride (1917)
 Whose Baby? (1917)

References

External links

1880 births
1926 deaths
American male film actors
American male silent film actors
Actors from Dresden
German emigrants to the United States
20th-century American male actors